Margibi-2 is an electoral district for the elections to the House of Representatives of Liberia. The constituency covers four communities of Mamabah-Kaba District; Cotton Tree, Dolo Town, Unification and Central Charlesville.

Elected representatives

References

Electoral districts in Liberia